Ieuan Arwel Hughes  is a paediatric endocrinologist and an emeritus professor of paediatrics at the University of Cambridge. Hughes is most notable for long-standing research into disorders of sex development (DSD), established one of the largest and most comprehensive databases of cases of DSD including publishing the Consensus on DSD management framework which, barely eight years after its publication, is now already accepted worldwide as the framework for care of patients and families with DSD.

Career
Hughes was a professor of paediatrics at the University of Cambridge, and the head of the School of Clinical Medicine's Department of Paediatrics for 23 years before retiring as an emeritus professor. Throughout his career in paediatric endocrinology, he specialised in disorders of sex development (DSD); he created a comprehensive database of DSD cases and established international consensus-based guidelines for the management of these cases. He also founded and chaired the Clinical Committee of the British Society for Paediatric Endocrinology and Diabetes and published over 230 original journal articles.

Societies
  Hughes was elected a Fellow of the Academy of Medical Sciences in 1998.

Awards and honours
  In 2014 he was awarded the James Spence Medal, the highest honour given by the Royal College of Paediatrics and Child Health.

Selected bibliography

References

Living people
Academics of the University of Cambridge
Fellows of the Academy of Medical Sciences (United Kingdom)
British paediatric endocrinologists
Recipients of the James Spence Medal
Year of birth missing (living people)